There are multiple Afghans named Sher Agha.
</ref>
|-
| ‘’’Sher Agha’’’ UK Music Producer ||
Works with Global artists and co-written Big White Room for Jessie-J. He is AKA Shai Sevin.
|}</ref>

References